Pietro Paolo Mennea (28 June 1952 – 21 March 2013), nicknamed  ("the Arrow of the South"), was an Italian sprinter and politician. He was most successful in the 200m event, winning a gold medal at the 1980 Moscow Olympics, and set a world record at 19.72 seconds in September 1979. This record stood for almost 17 years – the longest duration in the event history – and is still the European record. He is the only male sprinter who has qualified at four consecutive 200 metres Olympic finals: from 1972 to 1984.

Biography

Early life
Mennea, who was born in Barletta, started his long international athletic career in 1968 when he took part in a junior race in Termoli and he was registered in AVIS Barletta club; in 1971, he won the first of his 14 Italian outdoor titles in the 100 and 200 m. He went on to win two indoor titles in 60 m and 400 m, along with five Mediterranean Games gold medals in 100 m and 200 m. He competed at the European Championships with a third place in the 4 × 100 m relay. He made his Olympic debut at the 1972 Summer Olympics in Munich, where he made the final of the 200 m, his strongest event. He finished in third place, behind Valeri Borzov and Larry Black. Three more consecutive Olympic 200 metre finals would follow later in his career, the longest run ever in this event.

At the 1974 European Championships, Mennea claimed the 200 m gold in front of his home crowd in Rome, while also placing second behind Borzov in the 100 m and the 4 × 100 m. After some poor performances in the 1976 Olympic season, Mennea decided to skip the Olympics, but when the Italian public protested Mennea went to Montreal. He finished fourth in the 200 m and sixth in the 4 × 100 m relay. In 1977, he finished second in the world cup 200, where a photo finish separated him from Clancy Edwards of the United States. He successfully defended his European 200 m title in 1978 but displayed his capabilities in the 100 metres by also winning that event in Prague.

200 metres world record
In 1979, Mennea placed first in the 100 metres and second in the 200 m behind Allan Wells of Great Britain in the European Cup. Later in the year, aged 27, he took part in the World University Games, which were held on the high-altitude track of Mexico City. On 12 September 1979, he won the 200 metres with a time of 19.72. His time set a new world record, beating Tommie Smith's time of 19.83 set on the same track in the 1968 Summer Olympics. The record held for almost seventeen years before Michael Johnson broke it at the 1996 U.S. Olympic Trials. As of November 2020, only twelve athletes have recorded a better time over 200 metres than Mennea.  His time stands as the current European record. He also held the low-altitude world record, 19.96, from 1980 to 1983, set in his home town of Barletta.  On 17 August 1980, Mennea became the first sprinter to break 20 seconds for the 200 metres for the third time.

Olympic champion
Entering the 1980 Summer Olympics in Moscow, Mennea was a clear favourite for the Olympic gold, in part because of the United States boycott of the Moscow Olympics. In the 200 metre final, Mennea faced reigning champion Don Quarrie and 100 metre champion Allan Wells. Mennea drew the outer most lane with Wells in lane 7 to his inside. Wells got out to a blistering fast start and closed on Mennea within the first 50 m. They approached the straight with Wells more than a two-metre lead on Mennea with Quarrie in second and Silvio Leonard, hampered by his lane 1 draw, in fourth. However, in the straight Mennea gained ground and passed Quarrie and Leonard and at the very end of the race, just beating Wells, winning the gold by a mere 0.02 seconds. Later in the games, he was the anchor man on the Italian bronze medal winning 4 × 400 relay team. He also competed in the 100 metres, reaching the semi-finals.

Last years
In 1983, in Cassino, he clocked a manual 14.8 seconds in 150 metres, a world best time that he held until it was bettered by Usain Bolt in Manchester in 2009. However, he came back from retirement soon and won a bronze medal in the 200 m at the inaugural World Championships in Helsinki. A year later, he competed in his fourth consecutive Olympic 200 m final, becoming the first person to do so. The defending champion finished in seventh, and retired from athletics for a second time afterwards. Again, Mennea made a comeback, and competed in his fifth Olympics in Seoul, where he was the flag bearer: he qualified for the quarterfinals of the 200 m, but he decided to withdraw from the competition and did not take part into the next round.

Mennea admitted that he had used human growth hormone once during the last year of his career. In an interview to an Italian newspaper in 1987 he told that in 1984, during the Summer Olympics in Los Angeles, an American physiotherapist proposed a doping treatment to him. Back in Italy he tried two injections of human growth hormone but the crisis of conscience he got was so important that it induced him to retire from activity: "I realized that in my life I was looking for everything, except for that." Although the usage of the substance is banned in modern-day competition, it was not banned at the time by the IAAF.

After athletics
After his athletic career, Mennea worked as a lawyer and a sports agent.  He was a member of the European Parliament from 1999 to 2004 elected on the list of The Democrats, but failed in his attempt to be re-elected.  He also lobbied for independent doping testing.

Death
Mennea died on 21 March 2013, in a Rome hospital from pancreatic cancer. He was sixty years old. On the day of his death, the Italian Railways announced that the new superfast train Frecciarossa ETR 1000, entering service in 2014, would carry his name.

Achievements

Personal bests
Outdoor
 100 metres: 10.01 (+0.9 m/s;  Mexico City, 4 September 1979)
 200 metres: 19.72 (+1.8 m/s;  Mexico City, 12 September 1979)
 300 metres: 32.23 ( Rieti, 21 July 1979)
 400 metres: 45.87 ( Formia, 15 May 1977)

Honors and awards
 On 24 May 2012, the Mayor of Durrës, Vangjush Dako, bestowed upon Mennea the title of honorary citizen of Durrës.
 Furthermore, President of Albania Bamir Topi awarded Pietro Mennea with the "Medal of Gratitude" with citation: "For value and contribution as the former World record holder in Athletics and major figure in the Foundation "Pietro Mennea", created to help sport and research".
 The 2016 edition of "Sport Movies & TV - Milano International FICTS Fest" was dedicated to his memory.
 He also is in the FICTS "Hall of Fame".
 Asteroid 73891 Pietromennea was named in his honor. The official naming citation was published by the Minor Planet Center on 31 January 2018.

See also
 Men's 200 metres world record progression
 List of flag bearers for Italy at the Olympics
 Italy national athletics team – Multiple medalists
 Italian all-time lists – 100 metres
 Italian all-time lists – 200 metres
 Italy national relay team
 FIDAL Hall of Fame
 Italy national athletics team – More caps
 List of Italian records in athletics

References

External links

 
 
 

1952 births
2013 deaths
People from Barletta
Sportspeople from the Province of Barletta-Andria-Trani
Olympic athletes of Italy
Italian male sprinters
Athletes (track and field) at the 1972 Summer Olympics
Athletes (track and field) at the 1976 Summer Olympics
Athletes (track and field) at the 1980 Summer Olympics
Athletes (track and field) at the 1984 Summer Olympics
Athletes (track and field) at the 1988 Summer Olympics
Olympic gold medalists for Italy
Olympic bronze medalists for Italy
World record setters in athletics (track and field)
Italian sportsperson-politicians
MEPs for Italy 1999–2004
World Athletics Championships athletes for Italy
World Athletics Championships medalists
European Athletics Championships medalists
Medalists at the 1980 Summer Olympics
Medalists at the 1972 Summer Olympics
Olympic gold medalists in athletics (track and field)
Olympic bronze medalists in athletics (track and field)
Mediterranean Games gold medalists for Italy
Athletes (track and field) at the 1971 Mediterranean Games
Athletes (track and field) at the 1975 Mediterranean Games
Athletes (track and field) at the 1979 Mediterranean Games
Athletes (track and field) at the 1983 Mediterranean Games
Academic staff of the D'Annunzio University of Chieti–Pescara
Universiade medalists in athletics (track and field)
Mediterranean Games medalists in athletics
Universiade gold medalists for Italy
Universiade bronze medalists for Italy
Burials at the Cimitero Flaminio
Deaths from pancreatic cancer
Deaths from cancer in Lazio
Italian Athletics Championships winners
Medalists at the 1973 Summer Universiade
Medalists at the 1975 Summer Universiade
Medalists at the 1979 Summer Universiade